Ekaterina Vladimirovna Berezovskaya (born February 4, 1990) is a Russian journalist and TV presenter. Best known for her work at the   Channel One Russia.

Biography
She was born on February 4, 1990, in Moscow.

In 2012 Berezovskaya graduated from MGIMO (Faculty of International Journalism).

During her studies, from 2010 to 2011 she worked as a correspondent in the information service of the REN TV channel, from December 2011 to January 2014  at Russia 24. From January 2014 to June 2016 he was a correspondent for  Channel One Russia. From August to December 2016, she hosted the morning news broadcasts (weekly with Yuri Lipatov).

On January 23, 2017, Berezovskaya became the host of news broadcasts at 9:00, 10:00, 12:00 and 15:00.

On July 8, 2017, she hosted an unscheduled news release in connection with the participation of Vladimir Putin at the 2017 G20 Hamburg summit.

In March 2020, she made her debut as the host of the newscast Vremya.

In 2021, Berezovskaya was the host of the Direct Line with Vladimir Putin.

References

External links
 Лица Первого канала: Екатерина Березовская

1990 births
Living people
Russian television presenters
Radio and television announcers
Journalists from Moscow
Russian women journalists
Russian women television presenters
Moscow State Institute of International Relations alumni
21st-century Russian journalists
Russian reporters and correspondents